The 1953–54 WHL season was the second season of the Western Hockey League. The Calgary Stampeders were the President's Cup champions as they beat the Vancouver Canucks four games to two in the final series.

Final Standings 

bold - qualified for playoffs

Playoffs 

The Calgary Stampeders win the President's Cup 4 games to 2.

Awards

References 

Western Hockey League (1952–1974) seasons
1953–54 in American ice hockey by league
1953–54 in Canadian ice hockey by league